Persis or Fars is one of the thirty provinces of Iran.

Persis may also refer to:
 Persis (given name), a feminine given name
 PERSIS (organization), a religious organization in Indonesia
 Persis Solo, an Indonesian football team
 Persis or Perso "the destroyer", a fourth member of the Graeae mentioned by Hyginus

See also
 Persi (disambiguation)
 Persia (disambiguation)